The dusky-capped greenlet (Pachysylvia hypoxantha) is a species of bird in the family Vireonidae.
It is found in Bolivia, Brazil, Colombia, Ecuador, Peru, and Venezuela.
Its natural habitat is subtropical or tropical moist lowland forests.

References

dusky-capped greenlet
Birds of the Amazon Basin
dusky-capped greenlet
Taxonomy articles created by Polbot